Evan Breeze (1798 - 1855) was a Welsh poet and schoolmaster. He used the bardic name Ieuan Cadfan.

His published works include Yr Odlydd Cysurus, cyfaill i'r trallodus yn cynnwys amrywiol ddyriau, cofiant am amrai anwylion…carolau…emynau, etc. a volume of religious poems which was published in 1839 by H. Jones, Llanrwst. Breeze also preached at the local Wesleyan chapel.

He died and was buried in Llanerfyl in 1855.

References 

Welsh religious leaders
Wesleyan ministers
1798 births
1855 deaths
19th-century Welsh clergy
19th-century Welsh poets